Super Power Samut Prakan Football Club was a Thai football club based in Samut Prakan province. This club played in the Thai League 1. The club appeared in the AFC Cup 2007, the Asian equivalent of the UEFA Cup, and played its final group match against Singapore's Tampines Rovers on 22 May 2007 at the Thai Army Sports Stadium. In 2007, the team has adopted the yellow and red colours of its main sponsor, M-150, and wears yellow shirts with red trim and red shorts and socks.

History

Early years

The club was founded in 1977 under the name Osotspa F.C. in association with the company Osotspa, known for its energy drink M-150. Since 2006, the club used the nickname M-150th, and is sponsored by the company. Both the club and the company share the same logo.

1996–2000
The history and achievements of Osotspa go hand in hand with the coach Chatchai Paholpat, who held the position of manager at the club between 1996 and 2007. All achievements of the association were achieved under his leadership. The club participated in the 1996–97 season in the first edition of the Thai League T1. However, they could not hold off relegation, and fell to the newly founded Thai Division 1 League. They finished second in this league and fought in the play-offs for promotion to the Royal Police United from the first division. After the round of matches, Osotspa defeated Police and the club returned to the top league. Since their re-emergence in 1997, the club has become an integral part of the Premier League. In 1999 they reached the final of the Thai FA Cup collect, but were beaten 2–1 by Bangkok Bank at Supachalasai Stadium.

2000–2006
The club achieved respectable fourth and eighth-place finishes in the following seasons of the league. 2002 marked the most successful season in the club's history; Osotspa finished runners-up in the league, qualified for the AFC Champions League and won for the first time the Queen's Cup.

In the 2002–03 AFC Champions League season, Osotspa achieved a 7–4 aggregate victory over the Churchill Brothers to qualify for the competition proper. However, Osotspa struggled in the group stages, and were eliminated with zero points from three games and a goal difference of 1:20. The club finished the following 2003–04 and 2004–05 seasons in third place. They successfully defended their Queen's Cup title on both occasions,  to make it three consecutive victories in the competition. Osotspa were again only runners-up in 2006, but once again qualified for the Champions League. At the end of the season the longtime coach Chatchai Paholpat left the club.

2007–2016

Osotspa M-150 took part in the 2007 AFC Cup under new manager Arjhan Srong-ngamsub. They were again eliminated at the group stage, but with much-improved results – a close third with 10 points. They could not emulate such form in the league, however, finishing a disappointing 9th, 23 points behind winners Chonburi, followed by 4th the following year.

In the middle of 2009, Osotspa relocated to Saraburi Province and changed its name to Osotspa M-150 Saraburi F.C.

In 2010 the club signed Pairoj Borwonwatanadilok as their new coach. Under him, Osotspa came 7th 2010 season, 6th in 2011 season and 5th 2012 season in his three-season long tenure.

In 2013, after Pairoj's contract ended, the club replaced him with former Pattaya United coach Chalermwoot Sa-Ngapol.

In the 2015 season, Osotspa relocated from Saraburi Province back to Bangkok and used Rajamangala National Stadium as their home venue. In the late of the season, the club relocated from Bangkok to Samut Prakan Province and renamed to Osotspa M-150 Samut Prakan F.C..

In the middle of 2016 season, Osotspa Co., Ltd. made the change in their parent organization. They decided to expel their football section and establish independence authority. Super Power Football Venture has become the owner of Osotspa football club and rebranded it to Super Power Samut Prakan F.C.

Takeover
In October 2016, Samut Sakhon Football Venture who owns Samut Sakhon F.C. in Thai Regional League Division 2 attempted to buy the majority share of the club. The new owner aimed to rebrand the club to Samut Sakhon City Power F.C. and relocate it to Samut Sakhon Province. However, the takeover has been blocked by Football Association of Thailand since it against the club licensing rules of Asian Football Federation. After the later discussion, the takeover was collapsed and the club decided to stay in Samut Prakan. In July 2017, The club was complete to takeover by Pakorn Khlaiphet Phetchaburi businessman and he became new club chairman.

Merge with Jumpasri United, relocation and renaming
In the end of season 2017, the club announced its intent to relocate to Maha Sarakham Province and merge with Jumpasri United F.C., the club that played at that time in Thailand Amateur League and moved ground to Mahasarakham Province Stadium after receiving permission to do so from Football Association of Thailand. The club started having problems after Osotspa discontinue support and financial problems happened. After relocating to Maha Sarakham Province, for this reason, the legend Osotspa Football Club or Super Power Samut Prakan one of the longest established football club in Thailand since 1977 has officially ended at the end of season 2017.

Achievements
 Thai League 1:
Runner-up: 2002, 2006
 Queen's Cup:
Champions: 2002, 2003, 2004 
 Thailand FA Cup:
Runners-up: 1999
 Thai League Cup:
Champions: 1990
 Kor Royal Cup:
Champions: 2001, 2006

Performance in AFC competitions
 AFC Champions League: 1 appearance
2002–03: Group Stage
AFC Cup: 1 appearance
2007: Group Stage

Stadium and locations

Season by season record

P = Played
W = Games won
D = Games drawn
L = Games lost
F = Goals for
A = Goals against
Pts = Points
Pos = Final position
N/A = No answer

TL = Thai League 1

QR1 = First Qualifying Round
QR2 = Second Qualifying Round
QR3 = Third Qualifying Round
QR4 = Fourth Qualifying Round
RInt = Intermediate Round
R1 = Round 1
R2 = Round 2
R3 = Round 3

R4 = Round 4
R5 = Round 5
R6 = Round 6
GR = Group Stage
QF = Quarter-finals
SF = Semi-finals
RU = Runners-up
S = Shared
W = Winners

Former coaches
 Chatchai Paholpat 
 Arjhan Srong-ngamsub  
 Pairoj Borwonwatanadilok 
 Chalermwoot Sa-ngapol  
 Stefano Cugurra Teco 
 Kritsada Piandit 
 Somchai Subpherm  
 Pairoj Borwonwatanadilok 
 Chalermwoot Sa-Ngapol 
 Jason Withe 
 Apisit Kaikaew  
 Suksan Khunsuk

References

External links
 Official Website

Thai League 1 clubs
 
Football clubs in Thailand
Association football clubs established in 1977
Sport in Bangkok
Saraburi province
1977 establishments in Thailand
Works association football clubs in Thailand
Association football clubs disestablished in 2017